Doug Carpenter (born July 1, 1942, in Cornwall, Ontario) is a former head coach in the National Hockey League, the Quebec Major Junior Hockey League, the International Hockey League and the American Hockey League, and is a former hockey player in the Eastern Hockey League and the International Hockey League.

As a player from 1964–1974, he played for the Greensboro Generals and Roanoke Valley Rebels in the EHL and for the Flint Generals in the IHL. Upon retiring from hockey he became head coach of the Flint Generals (1974–1978) and later head coach of the Cornwall Royals of the QMJHL. Following stints with the New Brunswick Hawks and St. Catharines Saints of the AHL, he landed his first NHL head coach position with the New Jersey Devils. Lifelong friend of Don MacPherson. Later he coached the Toronto Maple Leafs. Also in the AHL he coached the Halifax Citadels twice, and the New Haven Nighthawks.

Coaching record

External links

Coaching profile at Pulling the Goalie

1942 births
Canada men's national ice hockey team coaches
Canadian ice hockey defencemen
Cornwall Royals (QMJHL) coaches
Flint Generals players
Greensboro Generals (EHL) players
Living people
Montreal Junior Canadiens players
New Brunswick Hawks
New Jersey Devils coaches
People from Cornwall, Ontario
Roanoke Valley Rebels (EHL) players
Toronto Maple Leafs coaches